Tremane Hurling Club is a hurling club based in Knockadanagan, east of Athleague, County Roscommon, Ireland. In 1976, the club won the Connacht Senior Club Hurling Championship.

Honours 
 Connacht Senior Club Hurling Championship (1): 1976
 Roscommon Senior Hurling Championship (11): 1956, 1960, 1963, 1968, 1972, 1973, 1974, 1976, 1979, 1980, 1995

References

External links 
Official site
Facebook page

Gaelic games clubs in County Roscommon
Hurling clubs in County Roscommon